A Colt Double Action (or Colt D. A. for short) is any of the double-action revolvers manufactured by the Colt's Manufacturing Company. The term is most commonly used for the historical 1877 and 1878 models, but it also may refer to the following firearms:

 Colt M1877
 Colt M1878
 Colt M1892
 Colt New Service
 Colt Cobra
 Colt Trooper
 Colt Python
 Colt Anaconda
 Colt King Cobra